Coleophora adrianae is a moth of the family Coleophoridae that can be found in Argentina and Chile.

References

External links

adrianae
Moths described in 1999
Moths of South America